Laurianne Delabarre (born ) is a French female volleyball player, playing as a setter. She was part of the France women's national volleyball team.

She competed at the 2009 Mediterranean Games. On club level she played for La Rochette Volley in 2009.
She participated in the 2011 Women's European Volleyball Championship.

References

1987 births
Living people
French women's volleyball players
People from Guingamp
Competitors at the 2009 Mediterranean Games
Sportspeople from Côtes-d'Armor
Mediterranean Games competitors for France